Euschistus ictericus is a North American species of shield bug.

Distribution
In Canada, E. ictericus is restricted to Ontario and Quebec. In the United States, its distribution reaches as far south as Texas and Louisiana, and only as far west as Utah, despite previous reports that its range extended from coast to coast.

Description

Ecology
E. ictericus lives in damp situations, on Carex comosa, Iris versicolor, Nymphaea odorata, Saururus cernuus, willows, Carduus horridulum, Heracleum maximum, Cuscuta, Glycine max, Vicia faba, Verbascum thapsus, Juncus, Perillus frutescens, polygonum densiflorum and Persicaria punctata. It is attacked by Euthera tentatrix, Beskia aelops and Cylindromyia euchenor (Tachinidae) and by the eastern meadowlark, Sturnella magna. E. ictericus is not commercially important as a pest.

References

Pentatomini
Hemiptera of North America
Insects described in 1763
Taxa named by Carl Linnaeus